Rannaküla is a village in Elva Parish, Tartu County in southern Estonia. It has a population of 65 (as of 1 January 2005).

References

 

Villages in Tartu County